Office Ladies is a rewatch podcast hosted by Jenna Fischer and Angela Kinsey which premiered on the Earwolf platform on October 16, 2019. It is also produced by Earwolf. In each episode, Fischer and Kinsey, who co-starred on the American television sitcom The Office as Pam Beesly and Angela Martin, "deconstruct" each of the show's episodes and offer behind-the-scenes commentary “that only two people who were there can tell you”, as well responses to fan questions. They are sometimes joined by guests that include former co-stars, producers and writers. The podcast aims to cover every episode of The Offices nine-season run. The managing producer is Codi Fischer (no relation to Jenna) and Sam Kieffer is the show's audio engineer. In May 2022, inspired by their podcast and friendship, Fischer and Kinsey released a book titled The Office BFFs: Tales of The Office from Two Best Friends Who Were There offering insight into their experiences while on The Office.

List of episodes

Animated Series 
On August 12, 2021, Fischer and Kinsey premiered the Office Ladies Animated Series on Comedy Central's YouTube channel. The series was a co-production with the animation studio Cartuna who used audio from the podcast to create animated reenactments from each episode. It ran for a total of 10 episodes.

Awards

See also 

 List of film and television podcasts

References

External links

Playlist of Office Ladies Animated Series on Comedy Central's YouTube

2019 podcast debuts
Comedy and humor podcasts
Earwolf
Film and television podcasts
The Office (American TV series)
Audio podcasts
American podcasts